Saint Woolos Hospital (Welsh: Ysbyty Sant Gwynllyw) is located in the Stow Hill area of Newport, Wales. It is managed by the Aneurin Bevan University Health Board.

History
The site for the hospital was donated by Sir Charles Morgan, 2nd Baronet. The hospital was designed by Thomas Henry Wyatt and was opened as the Newport Union Workhouse and Infirmary in 1837. A new infirmary building was completed in 1869. The workhouse itself was rebuilt in 1903. In 1915 it was agreed that it be converted into a Military Hospital for wounded soldiers, and it came under the control of the 3rd Western General Military Hospital in Cardiff. It joined the National Health Service as St Woolos Hospital, named after Saint Gwynllyw, patron saint of Newport Cathedral, in 1948.

See also
Newport Cathedral

References

Further reading

External links
St Woolos NHS website

Infrastructure completed in 1837
Psychiatric hospitals in Wales
Hospitals in Newport, Wales
Hospitals established in 1837
History of Newport, Wales
NHS hospitals in Wales
Poor law infirmaries
Military hospitals in the United Kingdom
Aneurin Bevan University Health Board